may refer to:

 The Love Suicides at Sonezaki, a 1703 play by Chikamatsu Monzaemon
 The Love Suicides at Sonezaki (1978 film), directed by Yasuzo Masumura
 The Love Suicides at Sonezaki (1981 film), directed by Midori Kurisaki